Oxyteninae is a subfamily of the family Saturniidae, until recently classified as a separate family, Oxytenidae. Its members are mostly from Central and South America.

Genera
This subfamily contains the following genera:
Oxytenis
Homoeopteryx
Therinia

Syns:
Asthenidia
Eusyssaura
Lycabis
Teratopteris

References

 
Saturniidae